Meadowville may refer to:

Meadowville, Nova Scotia, a community in Pictou County
Meadowville, West Virginia, an unincorporated community in Barbour County